Kremers is a German and Dutch surname, a variation of Kramer. 

Kremers may refer to:

 Erwin Kremers (born 1949), German football (soccer) player
 Gidons Krēmers (born 1947), Latvian violinist and conductor
 Helmut Kremers (born 1949), German football (soccer) player
 Jimmy Kremers (born 1965), American baseball catcher
 Johan Kremers (born 1933), Dutch Commissioner of the province of Limburg
 Kris Kremers (19922014), one of two Dutch students who died while hiking in Panama
 Nienke Kremers (born 1985), Dutch field hockey player

See also 

 Kramer (disambiguation)
 Krämer

Dutch-language surnames
German-language surnames